Leptodactylodon axillaris is a species of frog in the family Arthroleptidae.
It is endemic to Cameroon.
Its natural habitats are subtropical or tropical moist montane forests, subtropical or tropical high-altitude grassland, rivers, freshwater springs, rocky areas, and heavily degraded former forest.
It is only recorded to Mount Bamboutos, West Region, Cameroon and is threatened by habitat loss.

References

Sources
 IUCN SSC Amphibian Specialist Group,. 2013. Leptodactylodon axillaris. The IUCN Red List of Threatened Species 2013: e.T54427A16924959. https://dx.doi.org/10.2305/IUCN.UK.2013-1.RLTS.T54427A16924959.en. Downloaded on 21 November 2016.

Leptodactylodon
Endemic fauna of Cameroon
Taxonomy articles created by Polbot
Amphibians described in 1971
Fauna of the Cameroonian Highlands forests